Lizumbach is a river of Tyrol, Austria, in the Tux Alps.

The Lizumbach springs between Navis and Madseit near the mountain pass . North of Wattens, it unites with the Mölsbach thus forming the river Wattenbach.

References

Rivers of Tyrol (state)
Rivers of Austria
Tux Alps